The Rent Collection Courtyard is a clay collection of 114 life-sized sculptures in located in the courtyard of the former home of rural landlord Liu Wencai in Dayi County, Sichuan created by Ye Yushan and a team of sculptors from the Sichuan Academy of Fine Arts in 1965. It is a famous work of Socialist Realist sculpture showing an evil landlord collecting rent from poor peasants, it is one of the most powerful works of the cultural revolution.  Copies were made and put on display in Beijing after modification to make them more powerful as works of propaganda.

In the 1999 Venice Biennale, the contemporary Chinese artist Cai Guo-Qiang referenced the sculpture in the performance piece Venice's Rent Collection Courtyard in which he hired artisans to recreate the sculpture.

References

Chinese sculpture